β-Alanine ethyl ester is the ethyl ester of the non-essential amino acid β-alanine. It would be expected to hydrolyse within the body to form β-alanine.

References

Ethyl esters
Carboxylate esters
Amines